Ann G. Clarke (née Jewkes) is a British immunologist and co-founder of the Frozen Ark project.

Career

Clarke's research focused on the immunological relationship between mouse mothers and embryos. For six years she was an Inspector for the Human Fertilisation and Embryology Authority.

She and her husband, Bryan Clarke, made several scientific expeditions to French Polynesia, where they realised that the partula snail was facing rapid extinction after the introduction of a predator as a biological control for a different species. Inspired by this, they and Anne McLaren (1927–2007) founded the Frozen Ark project to preserve the DNA of species threatened with extinction.  the project held some 48,000 frozen samples from 5,500 species.

In 2017 Clarke was the subject of an episode of BBC Radio 4's The Life Scientific.

Selected publications

Personal life
Ann Jewkes married Professor Bryan Clarke (1932–2014) in 1960. They had a daughter and a son.

References

Year of birth missing (living people)
Living people
British women biologists
British immunologists